The Paraguay national rugby sevens team is a minor national sevens side. They have played in the Consur men's sevens championships. They have not qualified for any major global tournaments.

Tournament history

South American Games

Pan American Games

Rugby World Cup Sevens

See also
 Rugby union in Paraguay

References

Rugby union in Paraguay
Paraguay national rugby union team
National rugby sevens teams